The 1970 Texas gubernatorial election was held on November 3, 1970, to elect the governor of Texas. Incumbent Democratic Governor Preston Smith was reelected to a second term, winning 53% of the vote to Republican Paul Eggers' 47%.

Primaries

Republican

Democratic

Results

References

1970
Texas
November 1970 events in the United States
1970 Texas elections